Keady Lámh Dhearg Hurling Club is a Gaelic Athletic Association club located in the town of Keady in County Armagh, Northern Ireland. The club, affiliated to Armagh GAA, is almost exclusively concerned with the game of hurling; a sister club, Keady Michael Dwyer's GFC, provides for Gaelic football.

History
Predecessor hurling clubs in Keady were Éire Óg, which won the Armagh Senior Hurling Championship in 1927, 1932 and 1933, and Michael Dwyer's, which won the SHC in 1935, 1936 and 1937 but has since become a football-only club. Keady Lámh Dhearg was established in 1949, and from 1990 has taken over from Cúchulainn's of Armagh city as the dominant force in Armagh hurling.

Honours
Armagh Senior Hurling Championship (23)
1949, 1965, 1972, 1975, 1978, 1987, 1990, 1992, 1993, 1994, 1996, 1997, 1998, 2001, 2002, 2003, 2004, 2005, 2007, 2008, 2010, 2014, 2018

Ulster Intermediate Club Hurling Championship (1)
2007

Camogie
Keady Lámh Dhearg also fields camogie teams at several age levels, however their camogie team is actually called St. Patrick's Camogie Club Keady, and are one of the most successful teams in Armagh, and Ulster. In 2015, their u14 team won the All-Ireland title.

External links
Keady Lámh Dhearg GAA site

Gaelic games clubs in County Armagh
Hurling clubs in County Armagh
1949 establishments in Northern Ireland